Rubén Norberto Bruno (born August 9, 1963 in Buenos Aires, Argentina) is an Argentine former footballer who played as a forward for clubs of Argentina and Chile.

Teams
 River Plate 1975–1977
 Los Andes 1977–1978
 Huachipato 1978–1980
 Unión de Zapata 1980–1981
 Independiente de Neuquén 1981–1982

Titles
  River Plate 1975 (Argentine Championship)

References

External links
 
 Profile at En una Baldosa 

1963 births
Living people
Argentine footballers
Association football forwards
Club Atlético River Plate footballers
Club Atlético Los Andes footballers
C.D. Huachipato footballers
Argentine expatriate footballers
Argentine expatriate sportspeople in Chile
Expatriate footballers in Chile
Footballers from Buenos Aires